Pseudoacanthocephalus is a genus of parasitic worms belonging to the family Echinorhynchidae.

The genus has almost cosmopolitan distribution.

Species:

Pseudoacanthocephalus betsileo 
Pseudoacanthocephalus bigueti 
Pseudoacanthocephalus bufonicola 
Pseudoacanthocephalus bufonis  
Pseudoacanthocephalus caspanensis 
Pseudoacanthocephalus caucasicus 
Pseudoacanthocephalus coniformis 
Pseudoacanthocephalus elongatus 
Pseudoacanthocephalus goodmani  
Pseudoacanthocephalus lucidus  
Pseudoacanthocephalus lutzi 
Pseudoacanthocephalus nguyenthileae 
Pseudoacanthocephalus nickoli 
Pseudoacanthocephalus paratiensis 
Pseudoacanthocephalus perthensis 
Pseudoacanthocephalus rauschi 
Pseudoacanthocephalus reesei 
Pseudoacanthocephalus rhampholeontos 
Pseudoacanthocephalus shillongensis 
Pseudoacanthocephalus smalesi 
Pseudoacanthocephalus toshimai  
Pseudoacanthocephalus xenopeltidis

References

Echinorhynchidae
Acanthocephala genera